Silvio Meißner (born 19 January 1973) is a German former professional football midfielder who played as a midfielder, notably for VfB Stuttgart in the Bundesliga. He was born in Halle, East Germany, and during his early career, he was often played as a striker (for Chemnitzer FC) or as a defender (for Arminia Bielefeld).

Honours
VfB Stuttgart
 UEFA Intertoto Cup: 2000
 Bundesliga runner-up: 2002–03
 DFB-Ligapokal finalist: 2005

References

External links
 
 
 

1973 births
Living people
German footballers
Hallescher FC players
Chemnitzer FC players
Arminia Bielefeld players
VfB Stuttgart players
1. FC Kaiserslautern players
Bundesliga players
2. Bundesliga players
Sportspeople from Halle (Saale)
Germany B international footballers
Association football midfielders
Footballers from Saxony-Anhalt